Sabrina Goleš (born 3 June 1965) is a former Yugoslav tennis player.

Biography
Sabrina Goleš was ranked no. 3 among juniors in the world in 1983 (in the juniors, she won the Italian Open and Rolex Port Washington, reached the semifinals at Roland Garros and the Orange Bowl, and the quarterfinals at the US Open). 

Goleš competed for SFR Yugoslavia at the 1984 Los Angeles Olympics, where she made it to the finals, losing 6–1, 3–6, 4–6 to Steffi Graf. The same year, Goleš was part of the Yugoslav team that reached the Federation Cup semifinals.

In 1987, Goleš won the WTA tournament in Paris and four titles in doubles. She also competed in 1988 Olympic Games in Seoul where she beat Arantxa Sánchez Vicario.

Goleš has career wins over top 10 players Kathleen Horvath, Arantxa Sánchez Vicario, Claudia Kohde-Kilsch, Bettina Bunge, Kathy Rinaldi, Lisa Bonder, Katerina Maleeva, Manuela Maleeva, Carling Bassett, Hana Mandlíková, Andrea Temesvári, Nathalie Tauziat, and Virginia Wade.

Goleš was the captain of the Fed Cup team of Yugoslavia and coached the Fed Cup team of Croatia from 1992 to 1994.

WTA Tour finals

Singles 4 (1–3)

Doubles 8 (3–5)

ITF Circuit finals

Singles (1–2)

Doubles (0–2)

Grand Slam singles performance timeline

References

External links
 
 
 

1965 births
Living people
People from Stari Mikanovci
Croatian female tennis players
Hopman Cup competitors
Olympic tennis players of Yugoslavia
Tennis players at the 1984 Summer Olympics
Tennis players at the 1988 Summer Olympics
Yugoslav female tennis players
Universiade medalists in tennis
Universiade gold medalists for Yugoslavia
Universiade bronze medalists for Yugoslavia
Medalists at the 1987 Summer Universiade